Gorgias Press is an independent academic publisher specializing in the history and religion of the Middle East and the larger pre-modern world.

History 
Founded in 2001 by Christine and George Kiraz, the press is based in Piscataway, New Jersey. 

The publishes titles in history, religious studies, and linguistics, with special focus upon the Ancient Near East, Syriac, Arabic, Early Christianity, Classical Studies, Biblical Studies, Jewish Studies, and Islamic Studies.  Authors include Jamal-Dominique Hopkins, Sebastian Brock, Clinton Bennett, David C. Parker, Andrei Orlov, Iain Torrance, Philip Khuri Hitti, George Percy Badger, Ignatius Zakka I Iwas, Ignatius Afram I Barsoum, Ignatius Elias III, Carl Brockelmann, Aziz Suryal Atiya, and William Hatch. The press also publishes critical editions and English translations of previously untranslated or under-translated works, such as those of Hippolytus of Rome, Jacob of Sarug, and Isaac the Syrian.

As of 2019, Gorgias publishes 29 book series, including Gorgias Handbooks, Gorgias Ugaritic Studies, Judaism in Context, and Texts from Christian Late Antiquity. In addition to books, the press publishes several peer-reviewed academic journals, including the Journal of the Canadian Society for Syriac Studies and the American Journal of Ancient History. 

In 2010, Gorgias published three volumes of peer-reviewed articles as part of Foundations for Syriac Lexicography in association with the International Syriac Language Project. Beginning in 2012, the press published the first of an ongoing 35 volume English translation of the Antioch Bible, an Aramaic text of the Syriac Peshitta.

In 2018, German academic publisher Walter de Gruyter and Gorgias entered into an e-book distribution partnership. In 2019, Gorgias partnered with the King Faisal Center for Research and Islamic Studies to inaugurate the Library of Arabic and Islamic Heritage (مكتبة التراث العربي والاسلامي).

References

External links

Publishing companies established in 2001
Publishing companies of the United States
Piscataway, New Jersey
Academic publishing companies
Syriac literature
Ancient Near East organizations